Bùi Văn Long (born 10 October 1988) is a Vietnamese footballer who plays as a right-back for V.League 2 club Phố Hiến.

Despite being handed the captaincy for most of the 2016 season and having more than a year left on his contract, in October 2016 Văn Long announced he would be leaving Hoàng Anh Gia Lai F.C. to play for SHB Đà Nẵng.

References 

1988 births
Living people
Vietnamese footballers
Association football fullbacks
V.League 1 players
People from Hòa Bình Province
Hoang Anh Gia Lai FC players
SHB Da Nang FC players
Vietnam international footballers